Goals on Sunday is a British football discussion television programme on Sky Sports that shows highlights and analysis of the Premier League, Scottish Premiership and Football League Championship matches. Shown every Sunday and Bank Holiday Monday (under the name Soccer Extra), the programme is fronted by Alex Scott and Chris Kamara. The show also features a rotation of various guest analysts from the world of football.

The show has been praised for being more humorous and low-key than the rest of Sky's football coverage. However, The Daily Telegraph heavily criticised the programme by deeming it as "inane" and "presently brainless".

History
Kamara has formerly co-presented the show with Ian Payne, Rob McCaffrey, Clare Tomlinson and Ben Shephard.

Tomlinson left the show in October 2007 and was replaced until the end of the season by Paul Boardman with a handful of appearances from Jeff Stelling.

Ian Payne was confirmed as Kamara's new co-presenter ahead of the 2008-09 season, and his arrival coincided with the show's new set and titles. Payne left the show in 2010 and was replaced by Ben Shephard.

On 28 June 2019, Ben Shephard announced his departure from Goals on Sunday to allow him to spend more time with his family, effectively ending his time at Sky Sports. On 1 August 2019, Sky Sports announced that former Arsenal W.F.C. and England footballer Alex Scott would be Kamara's new co-host.

The show's theme tune was previously the Etta James version of "A Sunday Kind of Love".

Current presenters
Chris Kamara (2000—)
Alex Scott (2019—)
Laura Woods (stand-in presenter) (2019—)

Former presenters
Rob McCaffrey (2000–2007)
Clare Tomlinson (2007)
Paul Boardman (2007–2008)
Jeff Stelling (stand in; 2007–2008)
Ian Payne (2008–2010)
Ben Shephard (2010–2019)

References

External links 
 

Sky Sports
English football on television
Premier League on television
English Football League on television
2000 British television series debuts
2000s British sports television series
2010s British sports television series
2020s British sports television series